Timewave Zero is the fourth album release by Dutch Aggrotech band, Grendel. It was released in Europe on April 20, 2012 through Infacted Recordings and in the United States through Metropolis Records. It features a re-recorded version of their 2009 track "Chemicals + Circuitry". The track 'Deep Waters' features Dutch singer Lis van den Akker from Dutch act Misery.

Track listing

References

2012 albums
Grendel (band) albums